Shim Hye-jin (born February 6, 1966) is a South Korean actress and model. She was one of the leading actresses of the 1990s in South Korea. Shim started her career as a model and achieved stardom with a Coca-Cola commercial in the late 1980s. Due to her appearance in the commercial, Shim was dubbed "Cola-like Woman."

Filmography

Television series

Film

Variety show
2015, Brave Family EP 1 to 10 - (KBS, 2015)

Awards, nominations and honors

Jury
 In 2022, she was selected as jury member for Bucheon Choice: Features section at 26th Bucheon International Fantastic Film Festival.

References

External links 
 
 

South Korean radio presenters
South Korean television presenters
South Korean women television presenters
South Korean television actresses
South Korean film actresses
1966 births
Living people
Korea National Open University alumni
South Korean women radio presenters
Best Actress Paeksang Arts Award (film) winners